London Road is a 2015 British musical mystery crime drama film directed by Rufus Norris and written by Adam Cork and Alecky Blythe based on their National Theatre musical of the same name, which in turn is based on the interviews about the Steve Wright killings. The film stars Olivia Colman, Anita Dobson and Tom Hardy.

Cast

 Olivia Colman as Julie
 Anita Dobson as June
 Tom Hardy as Mark
 Kate Fleetwood as Vicky
 Clare Burt as Jan
 Claire Moore as Councillor Carole 
 Janet Henfrey as Ivy
 Paul Thornley as Dodge
 Jenny Galloway as Margaret
 Anna Hale as Jessica
 Gillian Bevan as Colette McBeth
 Michael Shaeffer as Simon Newton
 James Doherty as Seb
 Nick Holder as Ron
 Mark Sheals as Wayne
 Hal Fowler as David Crabtree
 Linzi Hateley as Helen
 Alecky Blythe as BBC newsreader

Production
The film was shot in Bexley in London. A number of cast members from the original production reprise their roles in the film, including Fleetwood, Burt, Moore, Shaeffer, Thornley, Fowler, and Holder.

Release
The live film premiere was screened in cinemas across the UK as part of National Theatre Live on 9 June 2015 and was released on 12 June 2015.

Critical reception
London Road received generally positive reviews from critics. Review aggregator website Rotten Tomatoes reports 76% of 67 critics gave the film a positive review, with an average rating of 6.8/10. The site's critical consensus reads, "Equal parts enthralling and unsettling, London Road uses an unusual documentary/musical hybrid to tell a grim true-life tale."

Accolades
The film's choreographer, Javier de Frutos, was nominated for and won the 2017 Chita Rivera Award for Outstanding Choreography in a Feature Film, beating fellow nominees Beauty and the Beast and La La Land. The film was nominated for two awards at the London Film Critics Circle Awards 2015 and won one:
Wins
 British Actor of the Year - Tom Hardy (shared with his roles in, Legend, Mad Max: Fury Road, and The Revenant)

Nominations
 British Film of the Year; lost to 45 Years

References

External links
  
 

2015 films
2010s crime drama films
2010s musical films
2010s mystery films
2010s serial killer films
British crime drama films
British musical films
British mystery films
British serial killer films
Drama films based on actual events
Films based on musicals
Films set in 2006
Films set in Suffolk
Films shot in London
Musical films based on actual events
Crime films based on actual events
BBC Film films
2015 drama films
2010s English-language films
2010s British films